Rhodium(III) nitrate is a inorganic compound, a salt of rhodium and nitric acid with the formula Rh(NO3)3. This anhydrous complex has been the subject of theoretical analysis but has not been isolated. However, a dihydrate and an aqueous solution are known with similar stoichiometry; they contain various hexacoordinated rhodium(III) aqua and nitrate complexes. A number of other rhodium nitrates have been characterized by X-ray crystallography: Rb4[trans-[Rh(H2O)2(NO3)4][Rh(NO3)6] and Cs2[-[Rh(NO3)5].  Rhodium nitrates are of interest because nuclear wastes, which contain rhodium, are recycled by dissolution in nitric acid.

Uses
Rhodium(III) nitrate is used as a precursor to synthesize rhodium.

References

Rhodium(III) compounds
Nitrates
Hypothetical chemical compounds
Hydrates